Mihkel Poll (born 14 August 1986 in Tallinn) is an Estonian pianist trained at the Estonian Academy of Music and Theatre under Ivari Ilja.

References
  Grieg in Bergen Music Festival
 Mihkel Poll official website

1986 births
Living people
Estonian classical pianists
Musicians from Tallinn
Tallinn Music High School alumni
21st-century Estonian musicians
Estonian Academy of Music and Theatre alumni
21st-century classical pianists